Roy Wang, also known as Wang Yuan is a Chinese singer-songwriter, television host and actor. He was named by Time as one of the 30 Most Influential Teens of 2017. Wang has been a UNICEF ambassador since 2018. He set up his own charity foundation, the Yuan Foundation, that focuses on helping the elderly and children.

Career 
At Roy's 15th birthday concert, he performed his first solo single "Cause of You", which was both written and composed by himself for his fans. The song was officially released in January 2016. Roy's post of this song on Sina Weibo has been re-posted for more than 471 million times. This song was also awarded Top 10 golden songs of Fresh Asia Charts, and Roy won the "Most Popular New Talent" award at the 9th CSC Music Awards for the song.

He released his second single which is written and composed by himself in October 2016, titled "The Best Time", as a gift to his alma mater for Chongqing Nankai Middle School 's 80th Anniversary.

In January 2017, Roy became an emcee for the second season of Zhejiang TV's prime time variety show, "Ace vs Ace" season 2. The show topped the TV ratings in China for the first quarter of the year and was viewed more than 5 billion times online.

In September 2017, Roy joined the cast of Dragon TV's variety show, "Youth Inn".

In October 2017, Roy joined the indie film, So Long, My Son, directed by the leading Chinese auteur Wang Xiaoshuai.

On 24 October, Roy's self-written and composed single "Seventeen" was released for his 17th birthday. He released his first English single, titled "Sleep" on 6 November. On 20 November, Roy released another single titled "Pride", which is dedicated to his mother. In 2018, Roy was cast as the male lead in the xianxia drama The Great Ruler. The drama was on air in 2020.

Roy's first digital album titled "Song For You" was released on 22 January. The proceeds from the sale of the album go to Roy's charity foundation, Yuan Foundation. In February 2018, Roy returned to host "Ace vs Ace" season 3.

In May, Roy was invited to attend Cannes Film Festival as the ambassador of two famous brand L'Oréal and Chopard. He was the youngest Chinese artist to make an appearance at the Cannes.

Roy partnered with Line Friends to create his own line of characters "ROY6". Merchandise based on the characters included apparel, toys, stationary and household items.

In January 2019, Roy was accepted into the Berklee College of Music.

In May 2021, Rolling Stone China Launches With Zhang Chu and Roy Wang on the Cover. Roy's second CD titled "Summer time" was released on 15 December.

Social activities 
On 18 May 2016, Roy was appointed as "Chongqing Civilized Tourism Public Welfare Ambassador".

In December 2016, Roy worked with the UN China Youth group to promote the "Imagine 2030" campaign, which aims at encouraging the young generation in China. He was recognized for his contributions at the closing ceremony by receiving a special award.

Roy was one of the delegates representing China at the 6th United Nations Economic and Social Council (ECOSOC) youth forum, held in January 2017. He spoke at the event as the representative of the United Nations Imagine 2030 Campaign, calling for equal access to quality education worldwide.

For a consecutive second year, Roy represented China at the United Nations ECOSOC youth forum held in New York UN headquarters, in his role as UNICEF Special Advocate for Education.

Charity foundation
On 27 October 2017, Roy announced that he has set up his own charity foundation called "Yuan Foundation" and that the first initiative has been carried out to help elderly with cataract regain their sight. The second initiative was to raise funds for children with Neuroblastoma.

On 5 February 2018, he became a columnist for Global People, a comprehensive current affairs magazine sponsored by People's Daily. In addition, Wang Yuan opened an exclusive column each month known as "Wang Yuan Says". During the anniversary of the Yuan Foundation on October 27, a breakdown of income and expenditure was released, including the income from Wang Yuan's album "song for you", the income from the Global People column, and the income from the live broadcast.

"Yuan Foundation" Events

Ambassadors 

 In 2014, Roy and his teammates were hired by the China Population Welfare Foundation as ambassadors for the "Happy Smile - Helping Children with Cleft Lips and Palates" charity project. He is the "Dream Ambassador" of the "Dream Project", a charity event organized by Mango V Foundation, together with members of the group.
 In 2016, Roy became the "Chongqing Civilized Tourism Public Welfare Ambassador"; On October 10, he became the "Mars Ambassador".
 In 2017, Roy served as "Chongqing Civilized Tourism Public Welfare Ambassador", "Campus Love Ambassador" and "Campus Public Welfare Ambassador", as well as "UNICEF Youth Education Ambassador".
 In 2018, Roy served as the "Ice and Snow Sports Promotion Ambassador" and "Winter Olympics Ambassador" of the 23rd Winter Olympics; He was named "China Blue - Ace Public Welfare Ambassador"; In November, he was appointed as UNICEF Ambassador; and served as Wild Rescue GO blue to Blue Public Welfare Ambassador.
 On November 20, 2019, World Children's Day, a high-level meeting of the United Nations General Assembly was held at the UN headquarters in New York to celebrate World Children's Day and the 30th anniversary of the adoption of the Convention on the Rights of the Child, where UNICEF Ambassador Wang Yuan spoke to call attention to the fact that every child should have the right to education.

Discography 
 Song for you - Single (2018) 
 Yuan - EP (2019) 
 The 400 Blows - Single (2020) 
 Summer Time - EP (2021)
 Bedazzling - Album (2022)

Filmography

Film

Television series

Variety shows

Accolades

References

External links 

 
 Roy Wang on iTunes
 
 
 ROY6-LINE FRIENDS

2000 births
Living people
Chongqing Nankai Secondary School alumni
Chinese male singer-songwriters
Male actors from Chongqing
Singers from Chongqing
21st-century Chinese male singers